Tomas Haake (born 13 July 1971) is a Swedish musician and the drummer of the extreme metal band Meshuggah.

Known for his polymeters and technical ability, Haake was named the fifth best "Modern Metal" drummer by MetalSucks.net in 2012. In the July 2008 edition of Modern Drummer magazine, Haake was named the number one drummer in the "Metal" category, as decided upon in the magazine's Readers' Poll. He was also included in 100 Greatest Drummers of All Time list by the Rolling Stone magazine (occupying the 93rd position).

Career 
Haake writes the majority of Meshuggah lyrics and also contributes spoken vocals on several songs ("Choirs of Devastation" on the album Contradictions Collapse, "Inside What's Within Behind", "Suffer in Truth", and "Sublevels" on the album Destroy Erase Improve, "Sane", "The Exquisite Machinery of Torture" on the album Chaosphere, "Spasm" on the album Nothing, as well as on several tracks on the album Catch Thirtythree and on the song "Dancers to a Discordant System" from obZen).

Haake also provides spoken vocals on Meshuggah guitarist Fredrik Thordendal's solo album Sol Niger Within and vocals on the song "Futile Bread Machine (Campfire Version)" from The True Human Design.

Influences 
Haake has cited musicians from heavy metal, jazz fusion and progressive rock as influences. He cites English bands such as Iron Maiden and Black Sabbath, American bands such as Metallica, Slayer, Megadeth, Anthrax, Testament and Metal Church, and Canadian band Rush. His favourite drummers include Phil Rudd  (AC/DC), Bill Ward (Black Sabbath), Vinnie Appice, Lars Ulrich (Metallica), Dave Weckl, Sebastian Thomson (Trans AM), Sean Reinert (Cynic), Neil Peart (Rush), Ian Mosley (Marillion), Terry Bozzio (Missing Persons and Frank Zappa), Vinnie Colaiuta  and Gary Husband.

Personal life 
Haake is married to actress/musician, Jessica Pimentel, beginning their romantic relationship in 2013.

Equipment 

Drums – Sonor SQ2 Series
14x14" Tom
16x15" Floor Tom
18x18" Floor Tom
22x18" Bass Drum (2x)
14x6" Sonor Artists Bronze Series Snare with Tama Power Hoops

Cymbals – Sabian
14" HHX Compression Hi-Hats
19" AAXtreme Chinese
19" HHX Stage Crash
21" HHX Stage Crash
20" HHX Stage Crash
19" Paragon Chinese/15" HH thin Crash (stacked)
15" HHX Stage Hats
22" Legacy Ride (as crash)
21" AAXtreme Chinese

Drum heads – Remo
Toms: (12", 14", 15", 18") Coated Emperors, Ebony Ambassadors – bottom
Bass drums: (22") Powerstroke 3 Coated – batter, PowerStroke 3 Ebony – front
Snare: (14") Emperor X – top, Snare Side Hazy – bottom

Hardware – Sonor, Pearl, Porter & Davies
Tama Speed Cobra single Pedal (2x)
Porter & Davies BC2 w/backrest

Sticks – Wincent Tomas Haake Signature Drumsticks

Discography 
Meshuggah

Contradictions Collapse (1991)
None (EP, 1994)
Selfcaged (EP, 1995)
Destroy Erase Improve (1995)
Chaosphere (1998)
Nothing (2002)
I (EP, 2004)
Catch Thirtythree (2005)
Nothing – Re-issue (2006)
obZen (2008)
Koloss (2012)
Pitch Black (EP, 2013)
The Violent Sleep of Reason (2016)
Immutable (2022)

References 

[ Meshuggah] at AllMusic
Tomas Haake Goes It Alone at DRUM! Magazine
Meshuggah DRummer Tomas Haake Is Dating SOmeone From Orange Is The New Black at Metal injection

External links 

Meshuggah official website
Meshuggah at MySpace
 Meshuggah at Nuclear Blast Europe
 Meshuggah at Nuclear Blast USA

Living people
Meshuggah members
People from Örnsköldsvik Municipality
Progressive metal musicians
Swedish experimental musicians
Swedish heavy metal drummers
Swedish songwriters
1971 births